Chris Foy (born 25 January 1983) is an Australian actor.

Biography
Foy's most recent recurring role was playing Matt Leyland on the ABC children's program Blue Water High. He has also appeared on Home and Away. Chris was also seen in "Our Lips Are Sealed" starring Mary-Kate and Ashley Olsen. Chris attended St Ives High School in Sydney, Australia until part way through year 12 when he left to pursue his acting career.

Filmography
Dance Academy (2010)... Jai (1 episode)
The Pacific (2010) .... PVt. Tony 'Kathy' Peck (episode 9)
Home and Away (2007) TV series .... Simon (3 episodes, 2007)
Blue Water High .... Matt Leyland (26 episodes, 2005)
Home and Away (1988) TV series .... Woody (unknown episodes, 2001)
All Saints .... Declan O'Brien (1 episode, 2000)
Stepsister from the Planet Weird (2000) TV film .... Matt
"Our Lips Are Sealed" (2000) .... Donny

External links 
 

Australian male child actors
Australian male soap opera actors
Living people
1983 births